is a Japanese track and field athlete. She competed in the women's pentathlon at the 1964 Summer Olympics.

References

1946 births
Living people
Place of birth missing (living people)
Japanese pentathletes
Olympic female pentathletes
Olympic athletes of Japan
Athletes (track and field) at the 1964 Summer Olympics
Japan Championships in Athletics winners